Jerry Pinto  (born 1966) is a Mumbai-based Indian-English poet, novelist, short story writer, translator, as well as journalist. Pinto's works include Helen: The Life and Times of an H-Bomb (2006), which won the Best Book on Cinema Award at the 54th National Film Awards, Surviving Women (2000) and Asylum and Other Poems (2003). His first novel Em and the Big Hoom was published in 2012. Pinto won the Windham-Campbell prize in 2016 for his fiction.
He was awarded the Sahitya Akademi Award in 2016 for his novel Em and the Big Hoom.

Background
Jerry Pinto is a Roman Catholic of Goan origin, and grew up in Mahim Mumbai. He received a liberal arts degree from Elphinstone College, University of Mumbai, and a law degree from Government Law College, Mumbai.

Career 
His 2006 book about actress Helen Jairag Richardson titled The Life and Times of an H-Bomb, went on to win the National Film Award for Best Book on Cinema in 2007.

His collection of poems, Asylum and Other Poems appeared in 2003. He has also co-edited Confronting Love (2005), a book of contemporary Indian love poetry in English. He returned to magazine journalism as a Consulting Editor at Man's World magazine. Later, he joined Paprika Media (the publishing house that brings out Time Out Mumbai and Time Out Delhi) to edit their special projects. He is now a freelance journalist, writing articles for the Hindustan Times and Live Mint newspapers, as well as  The Man  and MW

In 2009, he coauthored Leela: A Portrait with Leela Naidu, a semi-biographical book of anecdotes and photos from Leela Naidu's life. Leela Naidu was continuously listed as one of top ten or top five most beautiful women in the world in the 1950s and 1960s by magazines like Vogue.

His first novel, Em and the Big Hoom, was published in 2012, and won The Hindu Literary Prize that year. It was also shortlisted for the Commonwealth Book Prize.

He has translated several books from Marathi to English including Cobalt Blue, Baluta, When I Hid My Caste and I, the Salt Doll.

Books 
 Surviving Women. Penguin Books, 2000. .
 Bombay, meri jaan: writings on Mumbai, with Naresh Fernandes. Penguin Books, 2003.
 Asylum and Other Poems. (Poetry in English). Allied Publishers India., 2003. 
 Confronting Love, (edited with Arundhathi Subramaniam ) . (Poetry in English). Penguin Books India., 2005. 
 Helen: The Life and Times of an H-Bomb. New Delhi: Penguin Books India, 2006. .
 Reflected in Water: Writings on Goa. Penguin Group, 2006. .
 Bollywood Posters, with Sheena Sippy. Thames & Hudson, 2008. 
 Leela: A Patchwork Life with Leela Naidu. Penguin Group, 2009. 
 Em and the Big Hoom. Aleph Book Company, 2012. 
 Phiss Phuss Boom, with Anushka Ravishankar and Sayoni Basu. Illustrated by Vinayak Varma. Duckbill, 2013. 
 When Crows Are White, 2013. 
 Monster Garden . Illustrated by Priya Kuriyan. Duckbill, 2016. 
 Murder in Mahim, 2017.

Awards and honours 
 2007 National Film Award for Best Book on Cinema for Helen: The Life and Times of an H-Bomb
 2012 The Hindu Literary Prize winner for Em and the Big Hoom
 2013 Crossword Book Award (fiction) for Em and the Big Hoom
 2016 Windham–Campbell Literature Prizes (Fiction) for Em and The Big Hoom 
 2016 Sahitya Akademi Award for Em and The Big Hoom

References

External links 

Jerry Pinto's Website
About Jerry Pinto and his poems 
Jerry Pinto's book of poems, Asylum, reviewed by Ranjit Hoskote 
Hindustan Times columns by Jerry Pinto.
Live Mint: columns by Jerry Pinto
The Hindu: One per cent writing and 99 per cent rewriting
Windham–Campbell Prizes Website

1966 births
Living people
Indian male poets
English-language poets from India
Indian male journalists
Indian magazine editors
Writers from Mumbai
University of Mumbai alumni
Indian Christians
Indian columnists
Poets from Maharashtra
Indian male novelists
Indian children's writers
Indian political writers
20th-century Indian journalists
21st-century Indian novelists
Journalists from Maharashtra
Novelists from Maharashtra
20th-century Indian male writers
21st-century Indian poets